Adam Bede is a 1918 British silent drama film directed by Maurice Elvey and starring Bransby Williams, Ivy Close and Malvina Longfellow. It is an adaptation of the 1859 novel Adam Bede by George Eliot.

Plot summary 
A squire's grandson saves a farmer's niece from the charge of murdering her bastard baby.

Cast
 Bransby Williams — Adam Bede
 Ivy Close — Hetty Sorrel
 Malvina Longfellow — Dinah Morris
 Gerald Ames — Arthur Donnithome
 Claire Pauncefort -— Aunt Lydia
 Inez Bensusan — Sarah Thorne
 Charles Stanley — Seth Bede
 Ralph Forster — Squire

References

External links

1918 films
British silent feature films
1910s historical drama films
1910s English-language films
Films directed by Maurice Elvey
Films based on British novels
British historical drama films
Films set in the 1790s
British black-and-white films
1918 drama films
1910s British films
Silent drama films